Jeong Hyeon-jo (korean:정현조, hanja:鄭顯組, 1440–1504) was a politician and writer during Korea's Joseon Dynasty. He was the younger son-in-law of the Joseon Dynasty's 7th King Sejo of Joseon, and the son of Jeong In-ji (정인지).

His first wife was Princess Uisuk(의숙공주), King Sejo of Joseons younger daughter. His second wife was Lady Lee, General Yi jings daughter.

See also 
 Sejo of Joseon
 Jeong In-ji
 Han Myung-hoi

External links 
Tomb of Jeong Hyeon-jo and princess Uisuk 
 Jeong Hyeon-jo:Nate 
 Jeong Hyeon-jo:Naver 
 Jeong Hyeon-jo 
 정현조 문과 급제 기록 
 Temple Hoiam 

1440 births
1504 deaths
15th-century Korean people
Korean Confucianists
Korean revolutionaries